Robert Edward Randall (December 9, 1904 – March 7, 1988) was an American film actor known under his stage name, Robert Livingston. He appeared in 136 films between 1921 and 1975. He was one of the original Three Mesquiteers. He had also played The Lone Ranger and Zorro.

Life and career
Livingston was born in Quincy, Illinois, and died in Tarzana, California, from emphysema at age 83.

Often billed as "Bob Livingston," he was the original "Stony Brooke" in the "Three Mesquiteers" Western B-movie series, a role later played by John Wayne for eight films. He also portrayed Zorro in The Bold Caballero (1936) and the Lone Ranger in the 1939 film serial The Lone Ranger Rides Again directed by William Witney and co-starring Chief Thundercloud as Tonto. Livingston also appeared as the title character in The Lone Rider series, starring alongside sidekicks Al "Fuzzy" St. John and Dennis "Smoky" Moore. The role of the Rider had previously been played by George Houston.

Personal life
On December 18, 1947, he married Margaret Roach, daughter of director/producer Hal Roach. They had one son, actor/writer Addison Randall born on August 13, 1949. He was named after Livingston's younger brother, Addison Randall, who had died at the relatively young age of 39 while shooting the film The Royal Mounted Rides Again in 1945. Livingston and Margaret Roach later divorced in 1951, and he remained single thereafter. He is buried in Forest Lawn Memorial Park, Glendale, California.

Selected filmography

 Man-Woman-Marriage (1921) - (uncredited)
 The Queen of Sheba (1921) - (uncredited)
 Brown of Harvard (1926) - Harvard Student / Yale Cheering Section / Harvard Spectator (uncredited)
 Aloma of the South Seas (1926) - Swimmer (uncredited)
 Old Ironsides (1926) - Seaman (uncredited)
 Casey at the Bat (1927) - Male Chorus Member, Sextette Number (uncredited)
 Special Delivery (1927) - Postal Ball Guest (uncredited)
 Wings (1927) - Recruit in Examination Office (uncredited)
 Man, Woman and Sin (1927) - Dancer
 Vamping Venus (1928) - Soldier
 Our Dancing Daughters (1928) - Party Boy (uncredited)
 Redskin (1929) - Student (uncredited)
 College Love (1929) - (uncredited)
 Rio Rita (1929) - Dancer (uncredited)
 Why Bring That Up? (1929) - Chorus Boy (uncredited)
 Hit the Deck (1929) - Sailor / Chorus Member (uncredited)
 Sunny Skies (1930) - Dave
 Hot Curves (1930) - Baseball Player
 Dixiana (1930) - Circus Troupe / Bachelor Party / Plantation Party (uncredited)
 Borrowed Wives (1930) - Joe Blair
 Dance, Fools, Dance (1931) - Jack (uncredited)
 Strangers May Kiss (1931)
 Shipmates (1931) - Man on Patio Escorting Girls (uncredited)
 Neck and Neck (1931)
 Night World (1932) - Nightclub Patron (uncredited)
 Paris Interlude (1934) - Reporter (uncredited)
 Death on the Diamond (1934) - Higgins
 Evelyn Prentice (1934) - Reporter (uncredited)
 The Band Plays On (1934) - Bob Stone
 Buried Loot (1935, Short) - Bob (uncredited)
 West Point of the Air (1935) - Pippinger
 Baby Face Harrington (1935) - George
 Murder in the Fleet (1935) - Dr. Spencer (uncredited)
 Mutiny on the Bounty (1935) - Lt. Young (uncredited)
 Whipsaw (1935) - Airline Steward / Radio Announcer in Trailer (uncredited)
 Tough Guy (1936) - (uncredited)
 Three Godfathers (1936) - Frank Benson
 Small Town Girl (1936) - Wedding Celebrant (uncredited)
 Absolute Quiet (1936) - Co-Pilot
 Speed (1936) - George Saunders (uncredited)
 Suzy (1936) - Pierre (uncredited)
 Women Are Trouble (1936) - Hotel Clerk (uncredited)
 The Vigilantes Are Coming (1936, Serial) - Don Loring, The Eagle
 The Three Mesquiteers (1936) - Stony Brooke
 Ghost-Town Gold (1936) - Stony Brooke
 The Bold Caballero (1936) – Don Diego Vega / Zorro
 Roarin' Lead (1936) - Stony Brooke
 Riders of the Whistling Skull (1937) - Stony Brooke
 Larceny on the Air (1937) - Dr. Lawrence Baxter
 Circus Girl (1937) - Bob McAvoy
 Hit the Saddle (1937) - Stony Brooke
 Gunsmoke Ranch (1937) - Stony Brooke
 Come On, Cowboys (1937) - Stony Brooke
 Range Defenders (1937) - Stony Brooke
 Heart of the Rockies (1937) - Stony Brooke
 Wild Horse Rodeo (1937) - Stony Brooke
 The Purple Vigilantes (1938) - Stony Brooke
 Call the Mesquiteers (1938) - Stony Brooke
 Arson Gang Busters (1938) - Bill O'Connell
 Outlaws of Sonora (1938) - Stony Brooke / Dude Brannen
 Ladies in Distress (1938) - Pete Braddock
 Riders of the Black Hills (1938) - Stony Brooke
 Heroes of the Hills (1938) - Stony Brooke
 The Night Hawk (1938) - Slim Torrence
 Orphans of the Street (1938) - Bob Clayton
 Federal Man-Hunt (1938) - Bill Hasford
 The Lone Ranger Rides Again (1939) - The Lone Ranger / Bill Andrews
 The Kansas Terrors (1939) - Stony Brooke
 Cowboys from Texas (1939) - Stony Brooke
 Heroes of the Saddle (1940) - Stony Brooke
 Pioneers of the West (1940) - Stony Brooke
 Covered Wagon Days (1940) - Stony Brooke
 Rocky Mountain Rangers (1940) - Stony Brooke / Laredo Kid
 Oklahoma Renegades (1940) - Stony Brooke
 Under Texas Skies (1940) - Stony Brooke
 The Trail Blazers (1940) - Stony Brooke
 Lone Star Raiders (1940) - Stony Brooke
 Prairie Pioneers (1941) - Stony Brooke
 Pals of the Pecos (1941) - Stony Brooke
 Saddlemates (1941) - Stony Brooke
 Overland Stagecoach (1942) - Tom Cameron aka The Lone Rider
 Wild Horse Rustlers (1943) - Tom Cameron aka The Lone Rider
 Death Rides the Plains (1943) - Rocky Cameron alias The Lone Rider
 The Black Raven (1943) - Allen Bentley
 Wolves of the Range (1943) - Rocky Cameron alias The Lone Rider
 Law of the Saddle (1943) - Rocky Cameron aka The Lone Rider
 Raiders of Red Gap (1943) - Rocky (Lone Rider) Cameron
 Pistol Packin' Mama (1943) - Nick Winner
 Pride of the Plains (1944) - Johnny Revere
 Beneath Western Skies (1944) - Johnny Revere
 The Laramie Trail (1944) - Johnny Rapidan
 Goodnight, Sweetheart (1944) - Johnny Newsome
 Storm Over Lisbon (1944) - Bill Flanagan
 Brazil (1944) - Rod Walker
 Lake Placid Serenade (1944) - Paul Jordan
 The Big Bonanza (1944) - Sam Ballou
 Bells of Rosarita (1945) - Bob Livingston
 Steppin' in Society (1945) - Montana
 The Cheaters (1945) - Stephen Bates
 Tell It to a Star (1945) - Gene Ritchie
 Don't Fence Me In (1945) - Jack Chandler
 Dakota (1945) - Lieutenant
 The Undercover Woman (1946) - Sheriff Don Long
 Valley of the Zombies (1946) - Dr. Terrance 'Terry' Evans
 Daredevils of the Clouds (1948) - Terry O'Rourke
 Grand Canyon Trail (1948) - Bill Regan
 The Feathered Serpent (1948) - Prof. John Stanley
 The Mysterious Desperado (1949) - Honest John Jordan
 Riders in the Sky (1949) - Rock McCleary
 Mule Train (1950) - Sam Brady
 Law of the Badlands (1951) - Durkin
 Saddle Legion (1951) - Regan
 Night Stage to Galveston (1952) -Adjutant General Slayden
 Something for the Birds (1952) - General (uncredited)
 Winning of the West (1953) - Art Selby
 Once Upon a Horse... (1958) - Bob Livingston
 Girls for Rent (1974) - H.R.
 The Naughty Stewardesses (1974) - Ben Brewster
 Blazing Stewardesses (1975) - Ben Brewster

References

External links

 

1904 births
1988 deaths
Deaths from emphysema
American male film actors
American male silent film actors
Actors from Quincy, Illinois
Male actors from Illinois
Burials at Forest Lawn Memorial Park (Glendale)
Male Western (genre) film actors
20th-century American male actors